Rudenko is a Ukrainian surname, derived from the adjective , which means 'red'. Notable people with the surname include: 

 Aleksandr Rudenko (footballer, born 1993), Russian goalkeeper
 Aleksandr Rudenko (footballer, born 1999), Russian forward 
 Andriy Rudenko (born 1983), Ukrainian professional boxer
 Antonina Rudenko (born 1950), Soviet swimmer
 Bogdan Rudenko (born 1977), Kazakhstani-Russian ice hockey player
 Konstantin Rudenko (born 1981), Kazakhstani-Russian ice hockey player
 Leonid Rudenko (born 1985), Russian record producer and DJ, also known simply as Rudenko
 Lyudmila Rudenko (1904–1986), Soviet chess player
 Mykola Rudenko (1920–2004), Ukrainian poet, writer and philosopher
 Roman Rudenko (1907–1981), Soviet lawyer
 Sergei Rudenko (1885–1969), Soviet anthropologist and archaeologist
 Sergei Rudenko (general) (1904–1990), Soviet Marshal of Aviation
 Stanislav Rudenko (born 1962), Russian football coach 
 Vadim Rudenko (born 1967), Russian pianist
 Vitaliy Rudenko (born 1981), Ukrainian footballer
 Vladislav Rudenko (born 1996), Russian footballer 
 Yekaterina Rudenko (born 1994), Kazakhstani swimmer

See also
 

Ukrainian-language surnames
Surnames of Ukrainian origin